is a Filipino-Japanese actress and model known for being a finalist in Philippine reality television series, Pinoy Big Brother: Otso. She is also a part of the first batch of stars under Rise Artists Studio, a talent management arm of ABS-CBN Films.

Early life 
Oinuma was born on the 22nd of July 2000 in the city of Nagoya in Japan to a Filipino mother and a Japanese father. She lived in Japan until she was 4 years old before moving to the Philippines. Oinuma has 2 half-siblings and a stepfather in the Philippines. When she was 13, her mother grabbed the opportunity of migrating to Japan with her after a friend of theirs, whose mom works in an agency, told them about the support offered to women who have half-Japanese children.

Career

2018 - 2019: Pinoy Big Brother and Star Hunt 
In 2018, Oinuma was first seen in television as she became an official Housemate of reality TV show Pinoy Big Brother Otso, where she emerged as the Eighth Big Placer.

Before venturing into acting, she took part of the Star Hunt Academy Boot Camp (which is the exact program that created the now known P-pop groups, BINI and BGYO) but was not able to complete the training program.

2019 - 2020: Acting Debut 
In later part of 2019, Oinuma gets her first television role as a cast in Parasite Island. A year later, she got some acting stints in Maalala Mo Kaya: Mata and Philippine television sitcom Home Sweetie Home Extra Sweet.

2020: Rise Artist Studio Launch and First Lead Role 
She was launched as one of the first batch of artists under Rise Artist Studio, a talent management arm of ABS-CBN Films, in February 2020.

She then starred in the adaptation of one of Wattpad's most read stories, The Four Bad Boys And Me, in which she played the main role named Candice Gonzales. The series was co-starred by fellow PBB alumna Maymay Entrata and co-Rise Artists Rhys Miguel, Jeremiah Lisbo and Aljon Mendoza.

Another show was set to air for the actress; which was the collaboration project between Star Cinema and Brightlight Productions called Love on Da Move, playing the role of Chacha with Lisbo, but it was cancelled without airing an episode.

2021 - 2022 Starring in Teen Series and Big Screen Debut 
In May 2021, Oinuma portrayed Michiko Tarranza in the series He's Into Her, together with Belle Mariano and Donny Pangilinan.

On the same year, Oinuma played the role of Megumi in Love at First Stream, together with Jeremiah Lisbo and their fellow casts, Daniela Stranner and Anthony Jennings. The said movie was released in December 2021 as an official entry at the 2021 Metro Manila Film Festival .

During the "iWantTFC Unwrapped" event held in December 2021, it was announced that Oinuma joins the cast of a new series called Tara, G! The iWant TFC original series premiered a year later in October 2022.

In early 2022, Oinuma reprised her role as Michiko Tarranza for the second season of He's Into Her. The sophomore season with 16 episodes premiered weekly from May to August 2022, with fresh episodes dropping every Wednesday in iWant TFC, and every Friday in Kapamilya channel.

Filmography

Movie

Television

Digital/ Online Platforms

Brand Endorsements and Promotions

Music Videos/ Music Film

Discography

Other Performances

Awards and Nominations

*Lead the online voting for the said category which constitutes of 50% of the total score to determine the winner. Awards night to be held on March 29, 2023, at the Glass Garden Events, Pasig City.

Notes

References

External links 
 

2000 births
Living people
ABS-CBN personalities
Actresses of Japanese descent
Filipino female models
Filipino people of Japanese descent
Filipino film actresses
People from Nagoya
People from Aichi Prefecture
Pinoy Big Brother contestants
Filipino YouTubers
Filipino television actresses